Kapileswarapuram may refer to:
Kapileswarapuram, Krishna district, a village in Andhra Pradesh state, India 
Kapileswarapuram, East Godavari district, a village in Andhra Pradesh state, India